The cream-colored courser (Cursorius cursor) is a wader in the pratincole and courser family, Glareolidae. Both parts of the scientific name derive from Latin cursor, "runner", from currere, "to run" which describes their usual habit as they hunt their insect prey on the ground in dry open semi-desert regions of Western Asia and northern Africa.

Range
These coursers are found in Canary Islands, Cape Verde, North Africa and Southwest Asia. Their two eggs are laid in a ground scrape. The breeding season extends from February to September, but they may breed also in autumn and winter when local conditions (especially rainfall) are favourable. They are partially migratory, with northern and northwestern birds wintering in India, Arabia and across the southern edge of the Sahara. Some birds also breed in the southern desert regions in northwestern India and Pakistan.

They are rare north of the breeding range, but this species has occurred as far away as Finland, Ireland and Great Britain.

Description
These birds have long legs and long wings. They have slightly downcurved bills. The body plumage is sandy in colour, fading to whitish on the lower belly. The upperwing primary feathers and the underwings are black. The crown and nape are grey, and there is a black eyestripe and white supercilium.

In flight, this species resembles a pratincole with its relaxed wingbeats, pointed wings and dark underwings.

Subspecies
There are three subspecies of the cream-colored courser:

 C. c. cursor, (Latham, 1787): Canary Islands, North Africa Arabian Peninsula to Iraq
 C. c. bogolubovi, (Zarudny, 1885): southeast Turkey to Iran, Afghanistan, South Pakistan to northwest India  
 C. c. exsul, (Hartert, 1920): Cape Verde Islands

Taxonomic note
Hayman's Shorebirds treats the east African form littoralis as a race of the Somali courser rather than of cream-colored. Some authorities in turn consider the Somali, Burchell's and cream-colored coursers to be conspecific.

References

External links 

 Cream-coloured courser photos at Oiseaux.net

 
 
 
 
 
 

cream-colored courser
Birds of Cape Verde
Birds of the Middle East
Birds of North Africa
Birds of Pakistan
cream-colored courser
cream-colored courser